The men's 1500 metres event at the 1997 Summer Universiade was held at the Stadio Cibali in Catania, Italy on August 29, 30 and 31.

Medalists

Results

Heats

Semifinals

Final

References

Athletics at the 1997 Summer Universiade
1997